Anthony 'Tony' Sertich (born January 2, 1976) is a Minnesota politician and a former commissioner of the Iron Range Resources and Rehabilitation Board. A Democrat, he served in the Minnesota House of Representatives from 2001 to 2011, representing District 5B, which includes portions of the Iron Range in St. Louis County, which is in the northeastern part of the state. He also served as House Majority Leader from 2007 to 2011.

Sertich was first elected in 2000 at the age of 24, making him the youngest member of the Minnesota Legislature at that time. When Democrats took over the House in 2006, he was selected to serve as majority leader under Speaker Margaret Anderson Kelliher. While he won re-election in 2010, he did not seek a leadership position in the new Republican-controlled legislature. Shortly thereafter, he resigned his seat effective January 13, 2011, to accept Governor Mark Dayton's appointed to head the Iron Range Resources and Rehabilitation Board.

Sertich is a graduate of Hamline University in Saint Paul, where he received a B.A. in Theatre Arts and Political Science. After graduation, he worked for State Senator Jerry Janezich, who also represented the Iron Range. When Janezich ran for the United States Senate in 2000, then-Representative David Tomassoni ran for the Minnesota Senate, opening up the seat to which Sertich was elected.

References

External links

Rep. Sertich Web Page
Minnesota Public Radio - Votetracker: Anthony Sertich Voting Record
Project Vote Smart - Rep. Anthony 'Tony' Sertich Profile
 Iron Range Resources and Rehabilitation Board
Follow the Money - Anthony (Tony) Sertich Campaign Contributions
2008  2006 2004 2002 2000
 Rep. Sertich Campaign Web Site

Living people
1976 births
Democratic Party members of the Minnesota House of Representatives
People from Chisholm, Minnesota
Hamline University alumni
21st-century American politicians